The Potsdamer Kickers are a German football club based in the north of Potsdam in Brandenburg.

After the 2010–11 season and for the first time in their 17 years of existence, the Potsdamer Kickers were relegated; having started playing in the Kreisklasse, the team had slowly worked their way up through the German football league system to the Landesliga Brandenburg-Nord (VII) for the 2009–10 season, only to be relegated back to the Landesklasse after two years. In 2014 Kickers were sent back to the new Kreisoberliga (IX) but returned to the Landesklasse in 2016.

Women's team 
The club's women's team took part in the 2013–14 DFB-Pokal, the premier cup competition for women in Germany, and was knocked out in the first round by FC Viktoria 1889 Berlin.

League positions since 1994–95

References

External links 
 Potsdamer Kickers 

Football clubs in Germany
Association football clubs established in 1994
Football clubs in Brandenburg
Sport in Potsdam
1994 establishments in Germany